The Ambassador of the United Kingdom to Mongolia is the United Kingdom's foremost diplomatic representative in Mongolia, and head of the UK's diplomatic mission there.  The official title is His Britannic Majesty's Ambassador to Mongolia.

Britain was the first Western country to recognise an independent Mongolia when diplomatic relations were established in January 1963 with appointment of the British Chargé d'Affaires in Peking, Mr Terence Garvey, to Ulaanbaatar as non-resident Ambassador. In 1964 Mr (later Sir) Reginald Hibbert became resident Chargé d'Affaires in Ulaanbaatar. He was succeeded by Mr Heath Mason, who was appointed as the first resident British Ambassador in 1966. In 1968 the Embassy moved to a new building on Peace Avenue where it is still located today.

List of heads of mission

Ambassadors
1963–1964: Terence Garvey (non-resident)
1964–1966: Reginald Hibbert (chargé d'affaires)
1966–1967: Heath Mason
1967–1968: Oliver Kemp
1969–1971: Roland Carter
1971–1974: John Colvin
1974–1977: Myles Ponsonby
1977–1979: Julian Hartland-Swann
1979–1982: Thomas Haining
1982–1984: James Paterson
1984–1987: Allan Butler (diplomat)
1987–1989: Guy Hart
1989–1991: David Sprague
1991–1993: Anthony Morey
1994–1997: Ian Sloane
1997–1999: John Durham
1999–2001: Kay Coombs
2001–2004: Philip Rouse
2004–2006: Richard Austen
2006–2008: Christopher Osborne
2008–2009: Thorhilda Abbott-Watt
2009–2011: William Dickson
2011–2012: Thorhilda Abbott-Watt
2012–2015: Christopher Stuart
2015–2018: Catherine Arnold

2018–: Philip Malone

References

External links
UK and Mongolia, gov.uk
Previous ambassadors to Mongolia

Mongolia
 
Mongolia
United Kingdom